Lavonia is a city in Franklin and Hart Counties, Georgia, United States. The population was 2,156 at the 2010 census, up from 1,827 at the 2000 census.

Geography

Lavonia is located in northeastern Franklin County at  (34.436055, -83.106270). A small portion of the town extends southeast into Hart County.

History 
The Cherokee people were indigenous to the area in which Lavonia is located. A sophisticated tribe that typically dwelled in cabins by the 18th century, the Cherokee joined with the British during the American Revolution. When the American colonists prevailed, their land was issued as bounty land to those who had fought in the revolution. As a result, people of European ancestry began to move into the Lavonia area during the 1780s.

The founding of the town of Lavonia came as the result of the expansion of the railroad in northeast Georgia. A railroad line known as the Elberton-Airline Railroad desired another station further to the north. In a move typical for the time, businessmen in the area determined to build a town around the new railroad station. Upon division of the area into town lots and completion of all necessary legal procedures, the town of Lavonia was incorporated in 1880. The community was named after Lavonia Hammond Jones, the wife of a railroad official.

Transportation

Major highways

  Interstate 85
  State Route 17
  State Route 59
  State Route 77 Connector
  State Route 328
  State Route 403 (unsigned designation for I-85)

Airports
Broad River Air Park(3GE3), a private airport community featuring a 3000ft runway parallel to Interstate 85.

Demographics

2020 census

As of the 2020 United States Census, there were 2,143 people, 1,029 households, and 676 families residing in the city.

2000 census
As of the census of 2000, there were 1,827 people, 777 households, and 519 families residing in the city. The racial makeup of the city was 69.24% White, 28.95% African American, 0.11% Native American, 0.11% Asian, 0.38% from other races, and 1.20% from two or more races. Hispanic or Latino of any race constituted 0.88% of the population.

There were 777 households, out of which 28.4% had children under the age of 18 living with them, 43.5% were married couples living together, 18.3% had a female householder with no husband present, and 33.1% were non-families. 30.5% of all households were made up of individuals, and 16.3% had someone living alone who was 65 years of age or older.  The average household size was 2.35 and the average family size was 2.92.

In the city, the population was spread out, with 25.4% under the age of 18, 8.4% from 18 to 24, 25.1% from 25 to 44, 22.9% from 45 to 64, and 18.2% who were 65 years of age or older.  The median age was 38 years. For every 100 females, there were 80.2 males.  For every 100 females age 18 and over, there were 75.4 males.

The median income for a household in the city was $24,286, and the median income for a family was $28,464. Males had a median income of $29,250 versus $21,328 for females. The per capita income for the city was $12,876.  About 28.1% of families and 29.7% of the population were below the poverty line, including 42.6% of those under age 18 and 23.0% of those age 65 or over. Lavonia was the main place for trains to stop.

Library 
The Lavonia Carnegie Library is located in the city of Lavonia and named after philanthropist Andrew Carnegie. Established in 1911, the one-story Renaissance Revival-style building is important as a local landmark and has continued to be used as a library throughout its history. Lavonia is the smallest city in the entire United States with an original Carnegie Library building.

Arts and culture

Sports
Lavonia is home to Lavonia Speedway, a 3/8-mile dirt oval.  It is home to several different annual races such as the Buck Simmons Memorial, Rusty Jordan Memorial, and Charlie Mize Memorial. It also played host to an annual event with the World of Outlaws Late Model Series every single year from the years 2018 to 2021 as well as a one-off event in 2014 however after the event was rained out in 2022 they did not pick the date back up for 2023 and nothing has been announced for the future.

Notable people
Brandon Haley, Former NASCAR driver and Dirt Late Model driver
FPS Russia, YouTube personality
Ernest Vandiver, former mayor of Lavonia and governor of Georgia from 1959 to 1963

References

External links
City of Lavonia official website

Cities in Georgia (U.S. state)
Cities in Franklin County, Georgia
Cities in Hart County, Georgia